Donald Tait was an Anglican priest, most notably Archdeacon of Rochester and canon residential of Rochester Cathedral from 1915 until his death.

Tait was educated at Marlborough; Trinity Hall, Cambridge. He was ordained in 1888 and was chaplain at Trinity College, Glenalmond then curate at Malvern Wells. He was vicar of Bromley from 1904 and rural dean of Rochester from 1909, relinquishing both posts when appointed a cathedral-based archdeacon.

Notes

1932 deaths
Alumni of Trinity Hall, Cambridge
People educated at Marlborough College
19th-century English Anglican priests
20th-century English Anglican priests
Archdeacons of Rochester